Emile Benoit may refer to:

 Émile Benoît (1913–1992), Canadian fiddler
 Emile Benoit (writer) (born 1965), American author